Margarites olivaceus, common name the eastern olive margarite, is a species of sea snail, a marine gastropod mollusk in the family Margaritidae.

Subspecies
 Margarites olivaceus marginatus Dall, 1919
 Margarites olivaceus olivaceus (Brown, 1827)

Description
The size of the shell varies between 2 mm and 4 mm.

Distribution
This species occurs in circum-arctic waters; in the North Atlantic Ocean; in the Pacific Ocean off Oregon, USA; in the Sea of Japan

References

 Brown, T. 1827. Illustrations of the Conchology of Great Britain and Ireland.  [vi] + v, 52 pls. W. H. Lizars, D. Lizars and S. Highley: London. [True date: post 25 Nov.]
 Möller, H. P. C. 1842. Index molluscorum Groenlandiae. Naturhistorisk Tidsskrift 4: 76–97. 
 Dall, W. H. 1926. A new Margarites from Greenland. Proceedings of the Biological Society of Washington 39: 59. [Stated date: 30 Jul 1926.]
 Turgeon, D.D., et al. 1998. Common and scientific names of aquatic invertebrates of the United States and Canada. American Fisheries Society Special Publication 26 page(s): 60
 Gofas, S.; Le Renard, J.; Bouchet, P. (2001). Mollusca, in: Costello, M.J. et al. (Ed.) (2001). European register of marine species: a check-list of the marine species in Europe and a bibliography of guides to their identification. Collection Patrimoines Naturels, 50: pp. 180–213

External links
 

olivaceus
Gastropods described in 1827